Corna usually refers to the sign of the horns, a hand gesture.

Corna may also refer to:

Antonio della Corna (fl. 15th–16th centuries), artist
Giovan Giacomo Dalla Corna (c. 1485 – c. 1560), Italian violin maker
Luisa Corna (born 1965), TV presenter, singer and actress
Corna (Lycaonia), a town and bishopric of ancient Lycaonia, now in Turkey
Corna (moth), a genus of moths

See also
Corna Imagna, comune in the Province of Bergamo in the Italian region of Lombardy
Corna Mara, mountain of Lombardy, Italy
Corna Trentapassi, mountain of Lombardy, Italy
Cornas
Cornea
Crna (disambiguation)